Karel Beyers (12 March 1943 – 3 April 2020) was a Belgian footballer who played as a right winger.

Career
Born in Brasschaat, Beyers played for Verbroedering Brasschaat and Royal Antwerp.

He also earned 1 cap for the Belgium national team in 1964.

Later life and death
Beyers later served on Antwerp's board of directors. He also served as managing director and chairman of the family coffee business, Koffie Beyers.

He died on 3 April 2020, aged 77.

References

1943 births
2020 deaths
Belgian footballers
Belgium international footballers
Royal Antwerp F.C. players
Belgian Pro League players
Association football wingers
Royal Antwerp F.C. non-playing staff
Challenger Pro League players
People from Brasschaat
Footballers from Antwerp Province